Max Branning is a fictional character from the BBC soap opera EastEnders, played by Jake Wood. He made his first appearance on 27 June 2006. Wood took a four-month break from the show in 2011 and the character was absent between August and November 2011. Wood took a year long break from the show in 2015, with Max departing on 1 October. He returned on 24 December 2016. Wood took another short break from the show in 2018; Max departed on 16 February and returned on 23 April. It was announced in 2018 that Max would be taking a break from the soap in early 2019. He left on 14 February 2019 and returned on 7 May 2019. Max served as the show's main antagonist of 2017 following his release from prison and planning revenge on all his family, friends and neighbours. On 16 September 2020, it was announced that Wood would be departing from the role of Max after more than 14 years. Wood's final scenes aired on 19 February 2021.

Many of Max's storylines focus on his relationships, including his marriages to Tanya Branning (Jo Joyner), Kirsty Branning (Kierston Wareing) and Rainie Cross (Tanya Franks), and relationships with Gemma Clewes (Natalie J. Robb), Stacey Slater (Lacey Turner), Vanessa Gold (Zöe Lucker), Lucy Beale (Hetti Bywater), Emma Summerhayes (Anna Acton), Karin Smart (Denise van Outen), Carmel Kazemi (Bonnie Langford), Fi Browning (Lisa Faulkner), Ruby Allen (Louisa Lytton) and Linda Carter (Kellie Bright), many of which are extramarital affairs. Max has also embarked on feuds with his father Jim Branning (John Bardon), brothers Jack Branning (Scott Maslen) and Derek Branning (Jamie Foreman), as well as Sean Slater (Robert Kazinsky), Harry Gold (Linal Haft), Janine Butcher (Charlie Brooks), Phil Mitchell (Steve McFadden), Cora Cross (Ann Mitchell), Jay Brown (Jamie Borthwick), Carl White (Daniel Coonan), Charlie Cotton (Declan Bennett), Ben Mitchell (Harry Reid/Max Bowden), Ian Beale (Adam Woodyatt), Jane Beale (Laurie Brett), Steven Beale (Aaron Sidwell), Mick Carter (Danny Dyer), Martin Fowler (James Bye), Stuart Highway (Ricky Champ) and Kathy Beale (Gillian Taylforth).

In 2008, Max became central to a whodunit storyline that saw him being run over by a mystery assailant who was eventually revealed to be his daughter Lauren (Madeline Duggan). He has also had to come to terms with the death of his son Bradley Branning (Charlie Clements), being framed for attempted murder by Carl White (Daniel Coonan) and his girlfriend Emma's death. In October 2015, Max was wrongly convicted for Lucy Beale's murder, the true murderer was later revealed to be her younger half-brother Bobby (Eliot Carrington). After his release from prison, Max became the show's central antagonist as he sought revenge against Ian and Phil along with everyone else – including his own family – who saw him wrongfully imprisoned, by conspiring with James Willmott-Brown (William Boyde) in his nefarious scheme to redevelop Albert Square. Throughout the events of his revenge storyline, Max arranged for Jack to lose custody over his stepson Matthew Mitchell-Cotton; framed Phil's rival Vincent Hubbard (Richard Blackwood) for drug dealing, resulting in his arrest; blackmailed and later caused the death of Ian's stepson Steven; and forced Jane to leave Walford under the threat of having Bobby harmed in prison. The storyline ultimately concluded with Max attempting to commit suicide after his plan for revenge had failed, but this ended with both his daughters Lauren and Abi (Lorna Fitzgerald) accidentally falling off the roof from The Queen Victoria public house when they attempted to stop their father; Lauren survived the fall whilst Abi died. A couple of months later in 2018, Max married Tanya's sister Rainie in his bid to help win his custody case over Abi's daughter.

Storylines
Max arrives in Walford in June 2006 to confront his father, Jim Branning (John Bardon), after being estranged for 17 years, but Jim throws him out and Max meets his son Bradley Branning (Charlie Clements), and decides to stay to rebuild their relationship. Max's wife Tanya Branning (Jo Joyner) arrives to collect him and a month later, Max, Tanya and their daughters Lauren Branning (Madeline Duggan until June 2010, Jacqueline Jossa thereafter) and Abi Branning (Lorna Fitzgerald) move to Albert Square. Tanya learns about Max's affair with Gemma Clewes (Natalie J. Robb), but she gives their marriage one last try. As an apology, Max buys 10 Turpin Road for Tanya to open as a beauty parlour and begins spending time with Bradley.

Max thinks Bradley is too good for his girlfriend, Stacey Slater (Lacey Turner), and when she gets pregnant, he gives Bradley money for an abortion, telling him a baby will ruin his life. However, the abortion ends the relationship. To hurt Bradley, Stacey makes a move on Max and they have an affair, but Tanya tells Max she is pregnant. He tries to save his marriage despite promising Stacey that he will leave Tanya but when Stacey learns of Tanya's pregnancy, Max takes his family to Spain and a few weeks later, tells Bradley they are moving there permanently. Max returns with his family to find that Stacey and Bradley have reconciled and are now engaged. On the night of Bradley and Stacey's wedding, Max kisses Stacey and although she rejects him, Lauren's camcorder captures the kiss on video. Soon after, Tanya and Max's son, Oscar Branning, is born. Max and Stacey's affair is revealed at Christmas after Lauren makes a copy of the recording and gives it to Bradley. Both couples separate and Tanya files for divorce, but Max interferes with Tanya's romance with Stacey's brother, Sean Slater (Rob Kazinsky), and threatens to expose her as an unfit mother. With Sean's help, Tanya drugs Max and puts him in a coffin before burying him alive in the woods, knowing that a similar thing happened to him when he was 13 years old. An attack of conscience prompts Tanya to dig Max up and he decides to leave Walford as he can see how much devastation he had caused.

Max returns, and discovers Tanya is now dating his younger brother Jack Branning (Scott Maslen). Max tries to separate them by attempting to buy the house, seducing Jack's ex-girlfriend Ronnie Mitchell (Samantha Womack), and planning to frame Jack for a crime he did not commit. Jack abducts Max and forces him to stay away, after which Max and Tanya kiss. Later that evening, he is the victim of a hit-and-run which Tanya confesses to and is arrested. However, Lauren admits that she was driving the car and turns herself in to the police. Tanya is released and Lauren goes into care. She is found not guilty of attempted murder but guilty of grievous bodily harm and decides to go home. Max and Tanya start a secret relationship and Tanya later allows Max to move back in. Max gets into debt and starts conning people with false insurance claims, including Phil Mitchell (Steve McFadden), Heather Trott (Cheryl Fergison), Ian Beale (Adam Woodyatt) and Masood Ahmed (Nitin Ganatra). However, he is found out and debt collectors arrive and take his assets. Once the extent of Max's debts, lies and cons become clear, Tanya leaves with Lauren and Oscar but Abi stays. Max sinks into depression and sends Abi to live with her mother. Max and Bradley decide to go into business together and Roxy Mitchell (Rita Simons) rents the car lot to them. After Archie Mitchell's (Larry Lamb) murder on Christmas Day 2009, Max discovers that Bradley punched Archie because he raped Stacey, thinking that he is also the father of her baby. When the police come for Bradley two months later, Max helps him and Stacey flee but the police chase him to a rooftop where he stumbles and falls to his death. As Max and Stacey cry, she admits that she killed Archie. Stacey goes missing but Max finds her, and after an emotional confrontation, he takes her home and they agree not to tell anyone about Archie's murder.

Max meets Vanessa Gold (Zöe Lucker) after she buys a car from him. They start a casual relationship but she realises Max still loves Tanya and ends the affair. When Tanya sends Max their finalised divorced papers, he storms in to her house and tells her he still loves her. However, Tanya says she has moved on and reveals she and her new boyfriend Greg Jessop (Stefan Booth) are engaged, and will be married in a few months. Max attempts to reconcile with Vanessa, but she informs him that their relationship will never be serious. However, when Vanessa's husband, Harry Gold (Linal Haft) finds out about the affair, he throws her out and she moves in with Max. Vanessa's daughter, Jodie Gold (Kylie Babbington), also moves in with Lauren and Abi. Harry takes revenge by throwing a brick through their window, destroying Vanessa's clothes and killing Jodie's cat. Max and Jack threaten Harry, thinking it is over but Jack is kidnapped by orders from Harry, and Max finds him the next day in the boot of his car. Lauren concludes that Max killed Archie, because he has been displaying violent behaviour, but Max tells her that he made a promise to the killer to protect them. After Stacey tells Lauren that Max is looking after her, Lauren tells Max that she has worked out that Stacey is the killer. Lauren gets a confession from Stacey, Lauren informs Janine Malloy (Charlie Brooks) that Stacey killed Archie, and Janine publicly announces that Stacey is a killer, so Max helps her to escape. He drives her to the airport and says he does still love her but she says she only loves Bradley and then leaves the country. Max proposes to Vanessa, and she accepts. They announce their engagement to everyone, but Tanya confronts Max and tells him that she knows that he only proposed to Vanessa to make her jealous. Max and Tanya argue before sleeping together, and they begin an affair, but Lauren discovers this so Tanya decides to end it. However, it continues, despite Tanya marrying Greg. When the affair is revealed after he leaves Vanessa, Max goes to Tanya in hope he will be with her. Unknown to him, she has found out she may have cancer and tells him she does not love him. Kicked out by his children, Max decides to leave. Meanwhile, Tanya chases after Max but is too late, and watches as a tearful Max leaves Walford in his car.

Jack later reveals that Max is staying with their older brother Derek Branning (Jamie Foreman), and he wants to bring Max back as Tanya's family is falling apart. Max visits Tanya but ends up insulting her and she throws him out. As Max is about to leave, Lauren stops him, telling him that Tanya has cervical cancer and they need his help. Max talks to Tanya, and she explains her fears about her condition and reveals that she helped her sick father to die. Max then vows to support Tanya and stays with her along with Derek, although Tanya later throws Derek out. The family manage to enjoy Christmas together as they realise it might be Tanya's last one. When Tanya overhears Derek taunting a dying Pat Evans (Pam St Clement), she furiously brands him a "freak" and Derek is livid when Max sides with her. Max is unnerved, however, when Derek hints that he knows things about Max that he does not want Tanya to know. Max becomes sexually frustrated as Tanya is never in the mood for sex, and sleeps with Roxy Mitchell (Rita Simons) after he sees her naked. They kiss in an alleyway but are interrupted when a shout comes for Roxy. The next day, they text and call each other. Tanya then lies to Max that her nurse has recommended she does not have any sex. They are later shocked to discover Lauren has drunk so much she was passed out in the street. Lauren claims her drink was spiked, then says she is old enough to do what she likes after she is grounded. She then decides to move out. Max later has a change of heart and texts Roxy, telling her that nothing more can happen between them. Max is relieved when Tanya is given the all-clear from cancer. Tanya is unconvinced however, and remains distant. Tanya's mother, Cora Cross (Ann Mitchell) suspects Max of having an affair with Roxy. Max gets Roxy to admit to Cora that she attempted to seduce him, but that he refused her. However, after a frank discussion with Tanya over their marriage and above all sex life Max reassures Tanya that she is all that matters to him and that he will not be straying again.

When Tanya discovers that cars at the car lot are being repossessed, she and Max argue, which leads to passion and they have sex for the first time since Tanya's all-clear from cancer. Derek continues to allude to something Max did when he was staying with him. On Oscar's first day at school, Max claims he cannot attend as he is stuck in traffic, but he is instead seen posting an envelope full of money through somebody's letterbox. Max and Tanya plan to remarry, and Derek continues to remind Max that "they" want more money. Max gives Derek cash, but does not know that Derek does not pass it on. The day before the wedding, a drunken Lauren angrily tears up Tanya's wedding dress and destroys the cake, then reveals that she was drunk driving when she crashed Derek's car and her cousin Joey Branning (David Witts) took the blame, manipulated by Derek. She also reveals that she has been having a relationship with Joey. Max and Tanya cancel the wedding, and Max tells Derek that he wants nothing more to do with him after Christmas. Derek takes revenge by contacting the person involved in Max's secret, giving them Max's address. Max surprises Tanya with another wedding dress on Christmas Day, saying they can marry, but a woman claiming to be Max's wife, Kirsty Branning (Kierston Wareing), arrives. Max confirms to an angry Tanya that he did marry Kirsty but Derek had told him they were divorced. Kirsty reveals that she was pregnant by Max, but after Max left her to reunite with Tanya, Derek said that Max did not want the child, so she had an abortion. Max did not know about the pregnancy. Max confronts Derek and threatens to kill him for his lies and manipulation and Derek reveals that he always hated Max. Derek is forced out by Max, Jack and Joey and outside, he suffers a heart attack and dies.

Max has mixed-emotions over Derek's death, finding it difficult to grieve for his brother. Despite rifts between him and Tanya following Kirsty's reveal, they depart on holiday during the new year after Derek's funeral. On their return, things are relatively healed between them. However, Max passionately embraces Kirsty after a heated argument. He then believes she has left Walford until she arrives at Derek's funeral. When Lauren befriends Kirsty, Kirsty gives Lauren a set of keys, which Max finds in her pocket. Tanya later discovers them and assumes that Max and Kirsty are still involved. However, Kirsty eventually agrees to sign the divorce papers and gives them to Max. Max shows Tanya and says Kirsty is leaving, but she realises Max still loves Kirsty believed because he refuses to have sex with her and is sad about Kirsty leaving. Max confirms this, so Tanya ejects Max from the house saying their relationship is over for good, as Kirsty leaves Walford. When Kirsty posts her wedding ring to Max, he tracks her down and finds her being abused by her ex-boyfriend's brother, who beats Max up. Max and Kirsty return to Walford and live together at the B&B. Kirsty lies to Max that she is pregnant in an attempt to stop him returning to Tanya. Max encourages Kirsty to abort the pregnancy, but following another refusal by Tanya to rekindle their relationship, he changes his mind and moves into a new flat with Kirsty. Max and Kirsty's relationship comes under pressure due to the meddling of her ex-fiancé, Carl White (Daniel Coonan), and he and Tanya argue because of her refusal to take him back, as well as Lauren's alcoholism. When Lauren tells Max and Tanya she cannot stand their constant arguing, Tanya agrees and decides to take Lauren out of Walford for treatment. Max later finds out about Kirsty's fake pregnancy after finding a pregnancy test on the floor that she threw in the bin. He ends the relationship with Kirsty and tries to convince Tanya to reunite, but she leaves Walford for Lauren's sake, after telling a heartbroken Max she will always love him.

Struggling with losing Tanya, Max rebukes Kirsty's pleas for a reconciliation and struggles to look after Abi. Eventually, with Abi's blessing, they reunite, and Kirsty moves into their house. Lauren returns, having left her rehabilitation clinic early, worrying Max. Max's feud with Carl continues, and, determined to get rid of Max so he can win back Kirsty, he purposefully cuts the brakes on his car, and crashes it, leaving Phil in a critical condition. He frames Max for cutting the brakes, and forces Ian to become a false witness. Max is arrested and released on bail, until Carl goads him into attacking him, and he is remanded in custody. He then ends his relationship with Kirsty under Carl's instructions, who has threatened to harm Lauren. Carl also forces Max to tell his family he is guilty, and Lauren is the only person who believes he is innocent. On the day of Max's trial, Ian fails to turn up, and Max is released without charge, to Carl's fury. Max then heads to a wasteland with Phil, and it is revealed they have kidnapped Ian. They use Ian as bait to trap Carl, and then let him go, and Phil offers Max the chance to kill Carl. Max declines and returns to his family instead, resuming his relationship with Kirsty. however, Carl soon tells Max that he had sex with Kirsty while he was in prison, leading to Max ending his relationship with her. Several months later, Kirsty leaves Walford for good.

Max is stunned when Stacey's cousin, Kat Moon (Jessie Wallace), spots Stacey from a bus in London. He helps track Stacey down, but decides he cannot be involved when he realises he may still have feelings for Stacey. Stacey later turns to Max for help, but they end up in a passionate kiss, and Stacey later leaves Walford with Lily to stay with her mother Jean. Max later starts a sexual relationship with his daughter Lauren's best friend, Lucy Beale (Hetti Bywater), which they manage to keep a secret for several weeks. Somebody eventually finds out about Max and Lucy's affair, and e-mails him an image of the pair kissing. Max confronts Lucy, believing it is her trying to blackmail him, but it is revealed it is not. Eventually, Lucy ends her affair with Max due to her new relationship with Lee Carter (Danny Hatchard), which infuriates Max. A physical struggle ensues, which ends when Lucy falls over and hits her head on a chair. Max and Lucy have an explosive argument outside of the car lot, which sees Max grab Lucy violently by her arm. Later that night, Lucy is murdered by an unknown assailant (see Who Killed Lucy Beale?). Max becomes prime suspect after the police discover that Lucy was having an affair, and Max reveals all to David Wicks (Michael French). David initially tries to encourage Max to confess to the Beales and the police, but he refuses, and David threatens to tell the police everything. After Max's sister Carol Jackson (Lindsey Coulson) collapses and is rushed to hospital, David realises he must protect Max for her so gets rid of all of the evidence of Max and Lucy's fight.

Remembering the moving eulogy Max made at Bradley's funeral, Ian turns to him for advice over Lucy's impending funeral. Abi becomes irate when she sees Max supporting Ian and reveals that she knows that he was sleeping with Lucy and was the person that sent him the email of him and Lucy together. Abi's boyfriend Jay Brown (Jamie Borthwick) witnesses the confrontation between them and tells Phil, who in turn reveals the truth to a horrified Ian. At the funeral, Ian attacks Max when he sees him carrying Lucy's coffin and later Phil and Alfie Moon (Shane Richie) visit him and tell him that he is no longer welcome in any of Ian or Phil's businesses or The Queen Vic. Max then begins a sexual relationship with DC Emma Summerhayes (Anna Acton), the detective who is investigating Lucy's murder. Emma ends things when Max's rival, Dot's grandson Charlie Cotton (Declan Bennett) discovers their relationship and threatens to report it. When Stacey is released after an appeal, Max employs her at the car lot, but she decides to leave when he admits he still has feelings for her and it was those feelings that drove him to have the affair with Lucy. Stacey then encourages him to get back in touch with Emma, and she and Max resume their relationship. He impresses Emma's parents when they visit but when Emma wants to end their relationship because of the pressures of the case, Max makes an anonymous call to the police which starts an investigation into Emma's misconduct. Max is angry when Emma gives Lauren's laptop to the police, and as a result, Abi's behaviour regarding Max and Lucy is revealed to both the police and Lauren. After Emma is hit by a car in the Square, Max takes her to hospital where she dies from a bleed to the brain. Max finds Emma's case notes in his kitchen cupboard and rips them up in front of Carol, and then turns to alcohol to deal with his grief. Thinking Phil was responsible for the crash, he takes revenge by tricking his son Ben (Harry Reid) into signing over The Arches to him. When Max discovers Phil has been framed, he refuses to sign the business back to Phil despite Ben later telling him that Nick Cotton (John Altman) was responsible for the crash. After he is banned from Emma's funeral, Max visits Phil in prison to tell him he has taken over ownership of The Arches. Phil swears revenge on Max, and after being released, Phil regains the garage and also takes the car lot from Max.

Max struggles with the loss of his business, and stops taking care of himself or paying his bills. Carol discovers this and invites Max to move in with her and rent out his house to pay the mortgage. Desperate for work, Max takes a job at Ian's fish and chip shop. When Ben is arrested for Lucy's murder, Phil manipulates Abi into coming forward about Max's fake alibi to the police. Max is arrested and when Lucy's blood is found on his shoe, from where Jake Stone caused Lucy's nose to bleed on the night she died, he is charged with the murder. He later tells Stacey he knows Abi killed Lucy, and hires Marcus Christie (Stephen Churchett) as his solicitor. Despite Jane Beale (Laurie Brett) giving him a false alibi, he is found guilty thanks to Phil paying off the jury foreman. Upon hearing the verdict, Max escapes from court and manages to confront Jane in the hope of uncovering the truth. Jane simply says she believes Max is innocent and decides to help him escape to Ireland. Max wants to say a final goodbye to Lauren and Abi, so Jane goes to Carol's to find them. Carol realises Max is at Jane's so goes there and decides to go to Ireland with him. When Abi finds out Max is at Jane's, she calls the police. Max soon realises that Jane is covering for her adoptive son, Bobby Beale (Eliot Carrington), and that Lauren knew, so he disowns Lauren. Max is then arrested while shouting that Bobby killed Lucy, though it is dismissed as an act of desperation. He is sentenced to life imprisonment with a recommendation he should serve at least 21 years.

Seven months later, the truth about Bobby emerges and he is charged with Lucy's murder. Lauren and Abi attempt to visit Max in prison, but they find out that he has refused to see either of them. Max has a court hearing for his release, which Abi is reluctant to attend so Lauren writes Max a letter for Stacey to pass on, but Stacey misses Max at the court and hands it to his solicitor. Lauren and Abi wait for Max in The Queen Vic but he does not arrive, and when Lauren goes home, Max posts the letter back through the letterbox and quickly leaves in a taxi with Lauren failing to stop him. A week later, Max sends Ian a threatening note, saying he will never forget what he did. Max returns to Walford on Christmas Eve and claims that he has changed, giving up smoking and drinking, but in reality, he has become a dark man. He shakes hands with Ian and Jane, saying he wants to move on from the past. Lauren is glad to see Max but Abi is not as she is still angry with the way Max treated her during his trial. However, Max begs her to give him a chance and invites Abi, Lauren and Jack to have a drink with him. Abi accepts Max but Jack questions his motives. Stacey finds out that Phil bribed the foreman at Max's trial so that he could be found guilty, so tells Max. Max visits Phil at the hospital, but instead of suffocating Phil as Phil asks him to, Max states that he forgives him. Outside, Max burns his wrist with a cigarette, revealing that he has been self-harming.

Max attends Jack's wedding to Ronnie, and Roxy slips her bedroom key into his pocket. After the ceremony, Max goes to Roxy's bedroom and waits for her. There, he finds cocaine in Roxy's handbag. The next day, Max hears that Ronnie and Roxy have drowned and disposes of Roxy's cocaine so the police will not find it. Max supports Jack and his mother-in-law Glenda Mitchell (Glynis Barber) as they struggle to cope with their loss and to look after his children, Amy Mitchell (Abbie Knowles), Ricky Mitchell (Henri Charles), and Ronnie's son, Matthew Mitchell Cotton, whose father is Charlie Cotton. When a bus crashes into the market, Max organises the rescue of Stacey's husband, Martin Fowler (James Bye), from under the bus and is hailed a hero. Later, Max meets Hugo Browning (Simon Williams), the chairman  of a company called Weyland & Co, and they share a cryptic conversation in which Hugo talks about the development of Walford, to which Max says that the pub is next on his list. It is soon revealed that Max works for Weyland & Co, and they are planning to redevelop the Albert Square area. Lauren meets Max's boss, Josh Hemmings (Eddie Eyre), and they are attracted to each other, so she decides to apply for a job at Weyland & Co, despite Max telling her not to. Max tells Josh not to employ her but Josh does so anyway. Max convinces Shirley Carter (Linda Henry) to sell the freehold of The Queen Vic to a company called Grafton Hill. He also contacts Charlie, who returns to Walford and tells Jack they need to talk about Matthew. Charlie insists he will seek custody of Matthew and starts a fight with Jack in public; Jack punches Charlie. Max later visits Charlie when discovering the incident likely will not influence the legal case over Matthew, revealing their secret scheming, and says they have to take further actions; soon after, the police find Jack and arrest him for assault as Max watches. Jack is accused of badly hurting Charlie, who allowed Max to purposely attack and injure him to frame Jack for serious assault. The charges against Jack are dropped, and Charlie attempts to settle for residence of Matthew and plans to move to Ireland with him. Jack voluntarily gives Charlie residence of Matthew, but Max warns Charlie that he is not doing enough. Max gives him cash as a reward for his assistance and takes his mobile phone, telling him not to contact Jack again, threatening him with violence if he refuses. Charlie agrees and Max smashes Charlie's phone.

Max seemingly shows an interest in Carmel Kazemi (Bonnie Langford), who works at Walford Council's planning department. On their first date, he uses the opportunity to secretly look at her files from the council. When Ian and Jane plan to sell the fish and chip shop, they are shocked to discover the buyer is Weyland & Co. Ian pulls out of the deal, fearing Max's motives. However, Max convinces Ian that he does not have any ulterior motives and he just wants to move on. Max hears that Lauren and her boyfriend Steven Beale (Aaron Sidwell) are engaged, despite Steven lying to Lauren that he has a brain tumour. Lauren leaves a message on Max's voicemail, requesting him to refuse Steven when he asks him for permission to marry her. However, Max deliberately gives his permission, pretending he did not get Lauren's message. Max and Carmel have sex after their second date but he leaves before she wakes up and goes home, where his house appears to show him to be wealthy despite telling people that he lives in a bedsit. It is also revealed that he is in a relationship with Fi Browning (Lisa Faulkner), who works for Grafton Hill. Fi knows about Max and Carmel's relationship as it is part of a plan to get information from the council.

Max reveals to Steven that he knows about his brain tumour lie and stops Steven confessing to Lauren by telling her that Steven has three months to live. Max blackmails Steven, threatening that he will reveal his lie if he does not do what he tells him. When a group of tenants refuse to leave their flat, Max orders Steven to burn it down but make sure the tenants are out. When Steven does this, he tells Max that he does not know if the tenants got out. Jane finds out about Steven's lie and Steven tells Max that he will tell her that Max lied for him. Max grabs Steven by the throat and tells him if he does, he will kill him. Jane overhears Max and Fi talking about the redevelopment plan, which Max is using as revenge against those who wronged him in the past. Jane confronts Max in Ian's restaurant and at the same time, a gas explosion occurs on the Square so Max leaves Jane alone at the restaurant. Max confronts Steven at The Vic and orders him to kill Jane so she does not tell anyone. Steven sets fire to the restaurant with Jane inside and leaves her there, telling her this would not have happened if she had not let Max go to prison. Max and Steven go back to the restaurant and Max orders Steven to kill her. Steven refuses to allow her to die so Max angrily shoves him and forces him to leave. Max confronts Jane and tells her that while he was in prison, all he could think about was revenge on everyone who turned their back on him. He opens a hatch to allow the fire to spread to Jane and leaves, lying that he could not find Jane. Steven later dies from his injuries but Jane is rescued. Max goes to the hospital to see Jane, pretending to be her husband. He calls Jane's mobile and finds it in a drawer, then takes the SIM card out and bins it. Unable to speak, Jane tries to communicate with Sharon through writing but falls unconscious. Max tries to kill Jane by holding down on her breathing tube but stops when Ian walks in.

It is revealed that Weyland & Co is owned by James Willmott-Brown (William Boyde), and Josh, Fi and Max's former prison cellmate, Luke Browning (Adam Astill), are his children. When Jane awakens from her coma, Max orders her to leave Walford. As Jane and Ian make plans, however, James tells Max that Ian must remain in Walford, so Max threatens Bobby's safety to make Jane leaves alone. James tells Max that he wants access to some sealed bids belonging to the council. Carmel offers to help him but he changes his mind. However, Fi meets him at Carmel's house, where they have sex. Unbeknownst to Max, Fi then hacks into Carmel's computer and accesses the sealed bids; Carmel is suspended from her job, though is later cleared. Mick and Linda are asked to pay £60,000 for development funds to The Queen Vic, and Max suggests that Fi reduce it to £50,000 to regain the Carters' trust. Mick and Linda raise the money. Lauren discovers a scale model of Albert Square showing its development, and confronts Max, who assures her that the developers have pulled out. Max buys an engagement ring for Fi, which Carmel finds and assumes that Max is going to propose to her, so she gathers her friends and family in The Queen Vic. However, Max kisses Fi in front of everyone and Camrel leaves in tears. James and Luke then enter The Queen Vic and reveal that the Carters didn't raise the money for Grafton Hill which is owned by Weyland, meaning that they now own the Vic, with Fi denying that she offered any discount. They also reveal Max's involvement in not only this but the whole of the development scam. Everyone is shocked by Max's actions who is smugly delighted that everything has fallen into place for him.

Looking for the icing on the cake, Max proposes to Fi but is stunned when she refuses, much to the amusement of everyone in the pub. Max is further horrified when James and Luke betray him by burning his contract, revealing that he was being tricked all along. Speechless, Max sits defeated and alone in the Vic until Jack decides to take him home, fearing for Max's safety since his betrayal is now known to most of the square. Carmel's son, Kush Kazemi (Davood Ghadami), arrives however and punches Max for his treatment of Carmel, sending him flying over a table in a heap. Homeless and unemployed, Max is taken in by Jack who discovers his self-harming. The next day, Max is given his desk belongings by Luke from Weyland and Co and after seeing Wilmott-Brown and Fi in a car, he hysterically shouts at them for their betrayal. He then aggressively shouts at Jack until he is slapped by him. Josh gives Lauren the office copy of Max's contract, stating that he is entitled to the money and Weyland always set out to destroy him. He then lets Lauren decide what to do with the contract. Lauren demands the truth from Max, who says he did what he did to get money for his family. Lauren doesn't believe him and reveals the contract and threatens to burn it if he does not tell the truth; however, Max grabs it and destroys it himself, revealing that he doesn't care about the money and that all he wanted was revenge for everyone who lied or did nothing when he was sent to prison, including his own family. Max rages at Abi, Lauren and Jack who all leave, and he then smashes Jack's family photos. He goes to burn himself, but has no cigarettes left so headbutts a mirror instead.

Jack, regretting his decision to abandon Max during his trial, supports him despite Max's rant. He arranges for Oscar to visit Max on his birthday which delights Max. Max convinces Abi to help him bake a cake, but Cora arrives and says she has heard what he did and told Tanya, who has decided to make sure Max never sees Oscar again. Max, close to a mental breakdown over his recent losses, sees Phil, Mick, Vincent Hubbard (Richard Blackwood), Keanu Taylor (Danny Walters) and Aidan Maguire (Patrick Bergin) leaving The Albert bar together and realises they are planning something. He fails to try and manipulate Keanu into thinking that he will be used as collateral damage. Jack continues to support Max and after persuading Mick and Linda to let Max drink the Vic, the two have a day in the pub. Max thanks Jack for his recent help. However, Charlie returns to Walford with Matthew and tells Jack that Max caused his injuries and paid him to take Matthew away. Max pleads with Jack to forgive him but Jack disowns Max. He throws him out onto the street and after both Abi and Lauren give him the brush off, Max briefly leaves Walford.

Max returns and, angrier than ever, decides to get revenge on Ian and Phil. He surprises Ian in his house, stating that he is going to kill him. Ian says that Phil is the real culprit as he bribed the jury, but Max says that Phil is next on his list. Ian tries to escape Max by hitting him over the head with a frying pan, but Max pulls him back inside the house and starts to strangle him, just as Lauren walks in. Lauren stops Max from killing Ian, who tells Phil.

Stacey hears from Lauren that Max has tried killing Ian and calms him down, letting him stay with her and Martin. The next morning, Martin is unconvinced that Max will not come between Stacey and their family, so asks Stacey to get Max to leave, which she does. After asking Lauren and Abi to forgive him and see him on Christmas Day, which they both agree to think about, Max tricks Stacey into returning to her house and tries to convince her there is still a spark between them. Stacey initially resists but gives in and they have sex.

On Christmas Day, Max and Stacey both agree to keep quiet about the night before and Max is thrilled when Abi joins him for Christmas dinner, where he feels his grandchild kick for the first time. However, Stacey's phone is posted through the letter box and Max panics when he realises that Jane has left messages for Stacey about what Max did to her and Steven. After seducing Stacey again, he manages to delete them. To his horror, Tanya returns and reveals to Stacey that Max killed Steven and tried to kill Jane, having heard from Jane what Max did. Max desperately tries to deny it but its clear to Stacey that he's lying, and Tanya then tells him that she's taking their daughters away for their own safety. Under pressure from Stacey, Max finally confesses but tells her that he had good reasons. Stacey rejects him, saying he will never change and that she wishes he had died instead of Bradley. Ian attacks Max for what he did to Steven but is quickly over-powered and Max proceeds to punch him, before their fight is stopped by Lauren. Phil then confronts and beats up Max before brandishing a gun on him, but stops short of killing him when the latter tempts him into firing the gun. Max, having lost everything, goes to the roof of the Vic to jump but is seen by Tanya, Abi and Lauren who were about to leave. Despite Tanya's concerns and objections, Abi and Lauren go to the roof to try to talk him down. Max shouts at them to leave but after they both say they love him, he agrees to come down. Before they can get down, however, Lauren slips on the wet ledge and falls, taking Abi with her.

They survive the fall but are taken to hospital in a critical condition. Max tells a police officer that it is his fault, so he is arrested on suspicion of GBH. However, they receive a video filmed by Keegan Baker (Zack Morris), showing Lauren and Abi falling, so he is released. He goes to the hospital where Tanya initially accepts his comfort but pushes him away when a nurse arrives with news about one of their daughters. The nurse informs them that while Lauren is expected to recover, Abi is brainstem dead and has no chance of regaining consciousness. Abi's baby is delivered via cesarean section. Max is hopeful that Abi will recover and does not tell Lauren the truth, but she slaps Max when she finds out. After this, Max obtains a court order to stop Abi's life support being withdrawn and plans to take her to the US for a treatment that will cost £2,000,000, but Dr Harding urges Max to do the dignified thing for Abi as she is already dead and as Abi is not a minor, he has no legal right to take her. Max barricades himself in Abi's hospital room, but is talked into letting the hospital staff in when a nurse tells Max about her own son's death and that she never got to say goodbye. When Dr Harding explains what will happen to Max and Lauren, Max asks if the life support can be withdrawn at Abi's time of birth, 8.32pm. Tanya, Cora and Rainie return but Cora tells Max that Tanya does not want him present when the life support is withdrawn. Max finds Tanya in the hospital's chapel and she is angry with Max that Abi has to die because of him. However, just before Abi's life support is withdrawn, Tanya requests Max to be there. Abi then dies, leaving her family devastated. Max is hurt when he is led to believe that Abi's funeral has taken place, but he discovers it has not and Lauren tells him that none of the family want him present. On the day of the funeral, Max respects Lauren's wishes to not attend the funeral and visits Abi's daughter during the funeral to register her birth, but at the end of Abi's funeral, Jay allows Max to say his goodbyes and Max delivers his eulogy, prompting Max and Lauren to make amends. Abi is toasted in the Vic, her friends let off white balloons and her daughter is named Abi Branning as Max is determined to do things right.

Max returns two months later after buying the car lot, with the intention of gaining custody of Abi's daughter. He also marries Tanya's sister, Rainie Cross (Tanya Franks) in order to look like a family man, shocking everyone when she is revealed as his wife. The marriage is a scam and it's revealed he's going pay Rainie when he gains the custody. Phil is furious when he discovers that Max has returned and has one of his former businesses but despite his attempts to con Max, Max fends him off whilst mocking him. Despite a less than easy start, Max settles back into life on the square. Him and Rainie successfully fool their neighbours and social services whilst moving in with Jack. Rainie worries that Jack's girlfriend, Mel Owen (Tamzin Outhwaite) suspects their relationship is fake so they put on a convincing romance, including them passionately kissing. When Max realises that Rainie's kiss was real, he is shocked but she quickly admits it was a mistake. Donna Yates (Lisa Hammond), who was Abi's friend, tries to stop Rainie and Max getting custody of the baby, but Rainie admits to Donna that she wants to bring up the baby because she cannot have children of her own due to her former drug use. Cora also returns and offers Rainie a job in Exeter and a chance to bring up Abi with her and Tanya, but Rainie reveals Cora's £50,000 bribe to social services. Rainie searches for houses so she and Max can bring up Abi on their own, and Max thanks her, asking what she will do once she receives her pay-off. This leaves Rainie upset as she secretly wants to stay with Max and Abi. Feeling lonely, she has a one-night stand with Jack but they both agree to never talk about it again the next day, not realising that Jack's daughter Amy had seen them kissing and taken a video. When Rainie decides to leave, Max realises his own feelings for her and stops her at the train station where they agree to enter a real relationship.

Just as the Brannings seem to be back on track, Cora discovers from Amy that Rainie slept with Jack and she smugly informs Max. Devastated, Max punches Jack in the cafe and confronts Rainie, who admits to it but tells him that it happened when her and Max weren't properly together. Max decides to forgive them both for the sake of baby Abi and they agree to deny it since Cora doesn't have any proper evidence. However, in the pub, Cora repeatedly insults Rainie to the point where Rainie slaps her, before Cora punches her back. Whilst outside, Max scolds Rainie for her actions and tells her she may well have ruined his case for Abi. Meanwhile, Jack tends to Cora who tells him that contrary to his, Max and Rainie's beliefs, she does have evidence of the one-night stand because Amy took a video. Jack tells Max and Rainie about this and Rainie decides to confront her mother. She enters the Beale's house from the backdoor and Cora mistakes this as her attempting to kidnap baby Abi. Max finds out where Rainie is and finds both her and Cora arguing. When Cora hits Rainie over the back of the head with a frying pan, Max flees with Abi back to his house where he's joined by Stacy. Social services are called and they arrive to take baby Abi from Max, leaving him heartbroken. The next day, however, Rainie blackmails Cora into dropping her application for Abi after threatening to tell the police that she attacked her. Max receives a call from social services and after persuading Ian and Jack to be present at a meeting, he is given baby Abi to care for. Max is delighted and he later reconciles with Rainie.

A year later when Bobby is released, Max is horrified and began a conflict with his family as he can never forgive him for what he has done including his ruined relationship with Lauren and Abi. Max attacks Bobby but is stopped by Ben (now played by Max Bowden). However, Max decides to forgive Bobby, who he helps with hallucinations of Lucy and organises a party to celebrate Bobby's conversion to Islam. Max becomes close to Stacey's old friend Ruby Allen (Louisa Lytton) and after sleeping together, they begin a relationship. Stacey becomes jealous and warns Max not to hurt Ruby. However, Max cannot cope with Ruby's free spirited character, which leads to him neglecting Abi who almost swallows a medicinal pill. Max decides to end the relationship but they reconcile. Max discovers that Ruby slept with Martin and suggests that they have an open relationship that Max struggles to accommodate. Whilst on a boat party, Max learns that Jack has been supporting Lauren with her separation from Peter which leads to Jack punching Max. Max grows jealous when he sees Martin and Ruby growing closer. When he tells Ruby that can't handle seeing her with Martin, Ruby dumps him. After learning that Ian Beale (Adam Woodyatt) has bought The Queen Victoria with money that belonged to him, Max locks Ian in the walk-in freezer there and threatens him.

After developing a friendship during lockdown, Max supports Linda Carter (Kellie Bright) when he catches her having a drink, despite battling an alcohol addiction. Linda's friend Sharon Watts (Letitia Dean) tells Max to leave Linda alone, but after a heart to heart, Max and Linda kiss. A guilty Linda tells Mick, who angrily warns Max off. However, Linda's marriage continues to fall apart as Mick pushes her away, and she and Max kiss again. Max uses Linda as an alibi after Ian is attacked by an unknown assailant and left for dead. Mick tells Linda to stay away from him, and, hurt, she goes to stay with Max and the pair have sex. Linda becomes suspicious when Max starts to behave secretively, and it is revealed that Max had disposed of Linda's award from the Lucy Beale Foundation, assuming that Linda had attacked Ian. Max decides to join Lauren and Louie in New Zealand and asks Linda to follow him but she says no, so he leaves Abi in the care of Rainie and her husband Stuart Highway (Ricky Champ) and leaves the square alone. Several months later, Jack takes Abi to visit Max in France but returns without Abi and confirms to Denise Fox (Diane Parish) that Max has fled and taken Abi with him. He does not attend his stepmother Dot’s funeral in 2022 and Lauren reveals that they are not on speaking terms since she caught Max sleeping with her best friend.

Creation and development

Casting
Jake Wood was cast in the role of Max in January 2006. At the time, little was known of the character, who was to move in with Jim (John Bardon) and Dot Branning (June Brown). Wood commented: "I'm a great admirer of both John Bardon and June Brown and I'm looking forward to joining the Branning family." In March 2008, Max was temporarily written out of the show when Wood went on paternity leave. Wood said of this "It comes at a good time because Max is getting grief over his affair so he will disappear for a while." He returned three months later, in June. In May 2009, Wood signed a new two-year contract with the show after which he took a temporary four-month break from the show in August 2011, which Wood said was down to the fact that after five years of playing Max, he was tired and "needed a break". Wood returned to filming after signing another two-year contract, and Max returned with his older brother Derek Branning (Jamie Foreman) in November.

Characterisation
Wood has described Max as "damaged", with a troubled upbringing, and uses this backstory to justify Max's actions in the series, saying that Max is motivated to be a better father to his children than his own father was to him, and that Max has done nothing that would be out of character.

Storyline development
In May 2009, Wood said he hoped his character would get back with his wife, Tanya (Jo Joyner), saying: "He believes Tanya still loves him. I think she does too." Later in 2009 Max gets into debt and tries to con various Walford residents. On conning single mother Heather Trott (Cheryl Fergison), Wood said "Max has got a conscience but he's thinking about his own survival. He wants to keep his family at all costs." On hiding Max's debt problems from Tanya, Wood commented: "Max thinks he can wriggle out of situations and admitting to debt would be a blow to his manhood. But Tanya would have understood and he'd have kept his family. [...] The problem between Max and Tanya has always been honesty. If Tanya finds out she may never trust Max again." When Tanya discovers Max's lies, she leaves him. This storyline facilitated Joyner's temporary departure on maternity leave. The show's executive producer Diederick Santer commented: "Yet again, Max has messed up, hasn't he? He's learned to keep it in his trousers, but financially, he's corrupt. He's taken his eye off the ball business-wise and like a lot of people in the last year or two, he's found it tough going. His inability to show weakness or to share his problems with Tanya has been his downfall. He has to rebuild his life now and his long-term objective is to get Tanya back. Jo Joyner is of course returning to the Square but whether Max gets Tanya back is another thing. I don't know if he's good enough for her." Santer also revealed that some planned storyline material for Max and Tanya was put on hold until Tanya's return from maternity leave.

In March 2010, a new love interest for Max was announced, Vanessa Gold, played by Zöe Lucker. A spokesperson for the show said that "[Max and Vanessa] are both volatile and explosive characters and their meeting will be like putting a lit match next to a barrel [of] gunpowder." Wood said that Max is weak when it comes to women, although his desire is to have his wife and children back, adding that "He always makes mistakes, he's easily led and the grass is always greener. He's his own worst enemy."

In March 2011, it was revealed that Max and Abi would suffer severe injuries after their car crashes into a lorry on the way to Tanya's wedding to Greg Jessop (Stefan Booth), prompting Tanya to flee the wedding to help him. The crash scenes were filmed on 6 March 2011.

Sabbatical
On 28 May 2015, it was announced that Wood had decided to take a year-long hiatus from EastEnders. Of this decision, Wood said, "I have been at EastEnders for nine years and I feel the time is right to give Max a break—but it won't be for too long as I shall be back next year to see Max face another chapter of drama." Executive producer Dominic Treadwell-Collins added: "When I returned to EastEnders, both Jake and I agreed that Max has been through so much over the past nine years that we would give him and Jake a break when the opportunity arose. That opportunity has come and it is the perfect time to send Max Branning out with a bang that will send ripples through the Square for the rest of the year until Jake returns."

Max left on 1 October 2015 after being wrongly convicted for Lucy Beale's murder. He made a cameo appearance on 9 June 2016, making a quick return to the square to return Lauren and Abi's letter of apology then leaving again, indicating that he hasn't forgiven  them for letting him go to jail when they knew he was innocent.  " Max's full return aired on 24 December 2016.

Departure (2021)
In September 2020, it was announced that Wood would be departing from the cast of EastEnders after fifteen years in the role, with Max being written out as part of an "explosive exit". His final scenes were broadcast on 19 February 2021.

Reception
The storyline which saw Tanya bury Max alive prompted 167 viewer complaints, citing the inappropriate nature of the scenes, which aired prior to the 9.00 pm watershed. The BBC responded with the statement: "Whilst we appreciate that these episodes were dramatic, they were carefully filmed and edited in order that Max's ordeal was in the main implicit, rather than explicit, whilst still retaining their powerfulness. It's also important to note that Max made it out alive after Tanya realised she couldn't go through with her plan to leave him for dead. The burial is in no way glamorised or glorified, rather we see that when pushed to the edge, Tanya's behaviour becomes out of character, and indeed that it's Tanya herself who ultimately suffers because of her actions. Once again we are sorry that you did not enjoy these episodes." The UK communications regulator Ofcom later found that the episodes depicting the storyline were in breach of the 2005 Broadcasting Code. They contravened the rules regarding protection of children by appropriate scheduling, appropriate depiction of violence before the 9pm watershed and appropriate depiction of potentially offensive content.

Following Max's appearance in a single episode in 2016, a reporter writing for the Inside Soap Yearbook 2017 (released in November 2016) expressed their disappointment at "one glimpse" of Max, adding that it was "not good enough".

Wood has received a number of award nominations for his portrayal of Max. In 2007, he was nominated for Best Newcomer at the TV Quick and TV Choice Awards, and Best Soap Actor the following year and in 2010. In 2008 and 2009, he was nominated for Best Actor at the Inside Soap Awards, Also in 2009 he was nominated for Best Actor at The British Soap Awards. In 2010, he was nominated in the Outstanding Serial Drama Performance category at the National Television Awards, but was not shortlisted, and in February 2011, Wood was nominated for Best Actor in the Soap Bubble Awards for his portrayal of Max. In 2012, Wood and Joyner won the Best On-Screen Partnership category at the British Soap Awards. On Digital Spy's 2012 end of year reader poll, Wood was nominated for "Best Male Soap Actor" and came third with 15.2% of the vote. In August 2017, Wood was longlisted for Best Actor and Best Bad Boy at the Inside Soap Awards, while the revelation that Max is in a secret relationship with Fi was longlisted for Best Shock Twist. Wood made the shortlist in the Best Bad Boy category, although lost out to Connor McIntyre, who portrays Pat Phelan in Coronation Street.

See also
 List of EastEnders characters (2006)
 List of soap opera villains
 "Who's Been Sleeping with Kat?"
 "Who Killed Lucy Beale?

References

External links
 

EastEnders characters
Fictional salespeople
Fictional businesspeople
Fictional con artists
Fictional criminals in soap operas
Television characters introduced in 2006
Male villains
Fictional attempted suicides
Fictional characters with psychiatric disorders
Male characters in television
Fictional prisoners and detainees
Fictional teenage parents
Fictional blackmailers
Fictional kidnappers
Fictional murderers
Branning family